Mary Morgan is the name of:
 Jaye P. Morgan or Mary Margaret Morgan (born 1931), American retired popular music singer, actress and game show panelist
 Mary De Morgan (1850–1907), British author of fairytales
 Mary Morgan (infanticide) (1788–1805), Welsh servant convicted for killing her newborn child
 Mary C. Morgan, judge of the San Francisco County Superior Court and the first openly lesbian judge appointed in the United States
 Mary "Rae" Morgan, convicted of the manslaughter of her step-daughter Michele LeAnn Morgan
 Mary Sherman Morgan (1921–2004), American rocket fuel scientist 
 Mary S. Morgan (born 1952), professor of the history of economics in the London School of Economics
 Mary DeNeale Morgan (1868–1948), American painter

See also
 Mary Morgan-Grenville, 11th Lady Kinloss (1852–1944), British peeress